Jon Francis Lancaster (born 10 December 1988 in Leeds) is a British auto racing driver.

Career

Early life and karting
Lancaster was born on 10 December 1988 in Leeds, Yorkshire. He used to watch Formula One since he was three years old and always liked seeing cars. After getting his full karting licence, Lancaster was initially competing at Wombwell Kart Circuit in Barnsley, where he won in his sixth ever race in the Cadet class. The first competitive kart he owned was a basic 100 British pounds kit with engines supplied by Jenson Button’s father, John. Lancaster's father was a former racing mechanic and wanted his son to balance karting with studying at Horsforth School. Some years later, he was approached by Paul Lemmens, a talent scout. After having a talk with Lemmens, the talent manager Harald Huysman went to England to see Lancaster and was impressed, saying that he had "everything to be the best in the world". In 2006, as a 16-year-old, Lancaster was mainly appearing in the Formula A karting category with the Italian team Birel, finishing second in the World Championship and third in the European Championship.

Formula Renault 2.0
At the end of 2006, he moved up to single-seater formula racing, by competing in the Formula Renault 2.0 UK Winter Series with the AKA Lamac team. Lancaster finished sixteenth in the championship, recording a best finish of 8th during round 2 at Brands Hatch.

2007 saw Lancaster move up into the Formula Renault Eurocup driving for SG Formula's second team, SG Drivers Project. Lancaster struggled in the early part of the season, amassing only a second-place finish at the Hungaroring from the first six races, but he improved his form in the last eight races. Four consecutive wins during the last four races gave Lancaster a second place in the championship, behind Brendon Hartley. He dovetailed that European campaign with a season in the French Formula Renault Championship, competing in eleven of the series' thirteen races, finishing sixth with two wins coming at Magny-Cours and Barcelona. After those seasons, he competed for Hitech Racing's Junior team in the Formula Renault UK Winter Series, finishing fourteenth in the championship despite recording a third place at Donington Park in round two.

Formula 3 Euro Series
Lancaster moved up to the Formula 3 Euro Series for the 2008 season, driving for multiple champions ART Grand Prix. It was a testing year for the Yorkshireman, finishing twelfth in the championship including a win at the Nürburgring. The season wasn't without incident though, as Lancaster survived a horrendous crash during the season-opening race at Hockenheim. In a similar crash to that of Lucas di Grassi in 2005, Lancaster clipped the rear wheel of Jean Karl Vernay's car, while battling for sixth place and flipped over, skating over the tarmac runoff upside-down, before returning to its wheels in the gravel trap. The Englishman would sit out the second race, due to being at hospital for checkups. In non-championship races, Lancaster finished third at Zolder, for ART at the Masters of Formula 3 event and was 11th at the Macau Grand Prix for Manor Motorsport.

Formula Renault 3.5
Lancaster had been expected to return to the F3 Euroseries for the 2009 season, driving for SG Formula alongside Toyota junior drivers Henkie Waldschmidt and Andrea Caldarelli, but a pre-season disagreement with the team led to Alexandre Marsoin driving for the team. He joined Comtec Racing for the rest of the 2009 Formula Renault 3.5 Series season, taking his first win, during the series' first race at the Autódromo Internacional do Algarve in Portimão. He ended up thirteenth in the championship. He returned to the series in 2010, moving to Fortec Motorsport.

Formula Two
Lancaster began 2011 without a regular drive, but moved to Formula Two to take part in the Magny-Cours event only, driving with sponsorship from Silver Lining. He scored points in both races in which he competed.

Auto GP
Lancaster also competed two rounds in Auto GP with Super Nova Racing in 2011. He won at Donington in wet conditions.

GP2 Series
Lancaster made his GP2 Series début in 2012. He signed to drive for Ocean Racing Technology with fellow rookie Nigel Melker. He was replaced by Brendon Hartley after the first event of the season for budgetary reasons.

On 8 May 2013, newcomer GP2 team Hilmer announced that Lancaster would drive alongside Formula Renault champion and Sauber test driver Robin Frijns for the third round of the 2013 GP2 season. On his return, he finished on the podium in the feature race, benefitting from a penalty given to Carlin's Jolyon Palmer. With his team mate winning, it was a double podium for Hilmer.

Lancaster went on to take his maiden GP2 win on 30 June 2013 at his home round at Silverstone, the fifth round of the season. He won the sprint race, repeating the British success that weekend along with Sam Bird who also won that weekend the day before in the feature race.

Racing record

Career summary

Complete Formula 3 Euro Series results
(key) (Races in bold indicate pole position) (Races in italics indicate fastest lap)

Complete Formula Renault 3.5 Series results
(key) (Races in bold indicate pole position) (Races in italics indicate fastest lap)

Complete FIA Formula Two Championship results
(key) (Races in bold indicate pole position) (Races in italics indicate fastest lap)

Complete Auto GP results
(key) (Races in bold indicate pole position) (Races in italics indicate fastest lap)

Complete GP2 Series results
(key) (Races in bold indicate pole position) (Races in italics indicate fastest lap)

24 Hours of Le Mans results

Complete European Le Mans Series results

Personal life
Lancaster is an alumnus of Calverley Church of England Primary and Horsforth High School, and has interests in karting, football, bike riding. He is also a supporter of English football team, Leeds United.

References

External links

 
 

1988 births
Living people
Sportspeople from Leeds
English racing drivers
French Formula Renault 2.0 drivers
British Formula Renault 2.0 drivers
Formula Renault Eurocup drivers
Formula 3 Euro Series drivers
World Series Formula V8 3.5 drivers
FIA Formula Two Championship drivers
MRF Challenge Formula 2000 Championship drivers
Auto GP drivers
GP2 Series drivers
24 Hours of Le Mans drivers
FIA World Endurance Championship drivers
European Le Mans Series drivers
ART Grand Prix drivers
Hilmer Motorsport drivers
MP Motorsport drivers
Karting World Championship drivers
SG Formula drivers
Comtec Racing drivers
Fortec Motorsport drivers
Super Nova Racing drivers
Ocean Racing Technology drivers
Greaves Motorsport drivers